Prasophyllum triangulare, commonly known as the dark leek orchid, is a species of orchid endemic to the south-west of Western Australia. It is a tall orchid with a single, purplish to blackish, tubular leaf and up to thirty or more relatively large, greyish-purple to brownish-purple flowers. It only flowers after fire the previous summer.

Description
As with others in the genus, the flowers are inverted so that the labellum is above the column rather than below it. A broad callus covers most of the labellum, reaching almost to its tip. Flowering occurs in September and October but only following summer fire.

Taxonomy and naming
Prasophyllum triangulare was first formally described in 1882 by Robert D. FitzGerald and the description was published in The Gardeners' Chronicle. The specific epithet (triangulare) is derived from a Latin word triangulus meaning "triangular" referring to the narrow, triangular shape of the labellum.

Distribution and habitat
The dark leek orchid grows in shrubland, woodland and forest between Augusta and Albany in the Avon Wheatbelt, Esperance Plains, Jarrah Forest and Warren biogeographic regions.

Conservation
Prasophyllum regium is listed as "Not Threatened" by the Western Australian Government Department of Parks and Wildlife.

References

External links 
 
 

triangulare
Orchids of Western Australia
Endemic orchids of Australia
Plants described in 1882
Endemic flora of Western Australia